Ed Price may refer to:

 Ed Price (American football) (1909–1976), American football coach
 Ed Price (Florida politician) (1918–2012), Florida legislator
 Ed Price (Canadian politician)
 Ed Price (Louisiana politician) (born 1953), member of the Louisiana House of Representatives for Ascension Parish

See also
 Edward Price (disambiguation)
 Edwin Price (disambiguation)
 Edmund Price, poet